

B 

 
 
 
 
 
 
 
 
 
 
 
 
 
 
 2059 Baboquivari
 
 
 
 
 2063 Bacchus
 
 
 
 
 856 Backlunda
 2940 Bacon
 
 
 
 333 Badenia
 
 
 
 
 
 
 
 
 2513 Baetslé
 
 
 
 
 
 
 
 
 
 
 
 
 
 
 
 
 
 
 
 
 
 
 1280 Baillauda
 
 
 
 
 
 
 
 
 
 
 
 
 
 
 
 
 
 
 
 
 
 
 
 
 
 
 
 3749 Balam
 
 
 
 
 
 
 
 
 
 
 
 
 
 
 
 
 
 
 
 
 770 Bali
 
 
 
 
 
 11277 Ballard
 
 
 4391 Balodis
 
 
 
 
 
 2031 BAM
 324 Bamberga
 
 
 
 
 1286 Banachiewicza
 
 
 1713 Bancilhon
 
 
 
 
 597 Bandusia
 
 
 
 
 
 
 
 
 
 
 
 
 
 
 298 Baptistina
 
 
 
 
 
 
 
 
 
 234 Barbara
 
 
 19982 Barbaradoore
 
 
 
 
 
 
 
 
 
 
 
 
 
 
 
 
 945 Barcelona
 
 
 1615 Bardwell
 
 
 
 
 
 
 
 4524 Barklajdetolli
 2730 Barks
 
 
 
 819 Barnardiana
 5655 Barney
 
 
 
 
 
 
 
 
 
 1703 Barry
 
 
 
 
 
 
 
 
 
 
 
 
 
 
 
 
 
 
 
 
 
 
 
 
 
 
 
 
 
 
 6084 Bascom
 
 
 
 
 
 
 
 2033 Basilea
 
 
 
 
 
 
 
 
 6460 Bassano
 
 
 
 
 4318 Baťa
 
 
 
 
 
 
 
 441 Bathilde
 
 592 Bathseba
 
 
 
 
 
 
 
 
 
 9115 Battisti
 172 Baucis
 
 
 
 1553 Bauersfelda
 
 151997 Bauhinia
 
 
 
 813 Baumeia
 
 
 
 
 
 
 301 Bavaria
 
 
 
 
 
 
 
 
 656 Beagle
 
 
 
 
 1043 Beate
 
 
 
 
 
 
 83 Beatrix
 
 
 
 
 
 
 
 
 
 
 
 
 
 
 
 1349 Bechuana
 
 
 
 
 3737 Beckman
 
 
 
 
 
 3691 Bede
 
 15092 Beegees
 
 
 
 1815 Beethoven
 
 
 
 943 Begonia
 
 
 17102 Begzhigitova
 
 
 
 1651 Behrens
 
 
 
 
 
 
 
 
 1474 Beira
 
 
 
 
 
 
 
 
 
 
 
 
 
 
 
 1052 Belgica
 
 
 
 
 178 Belisana
 1074 Beljawskya
 
 
 695 Bella
 
 
 
 
 
 
 
 
 
 
 
 28 Bellona
 
 
 
 
 1004 Belopolskya
 
 
 
 
 
 
 
 2368 Beltrovata
 
 
 
 
 
 
 
 
 
 
 
 
 
 
 734 Benda
 
 
 
 
 
 
 
 
 
 
 1846 Bengt
 1784 Benguella
 
 
 
 
 45737 Benita
 
 
 976 Benjamina
 
 
 
 
 
 
 
 
 
 863 Benkoela
 
 
 
 
 101955 Bennu
 
 
 
 
 
 
 
 
 
 
 
 
 
 
 1517 Beograd
 
 
 
 
 
 
 
 776 Berbericia
 
 
 
 
 653 Berenike
 
 5682 Beresford
 
 
 
 
 
 
 
 
 
 
 
 
 
 
 716 Berkeley
 
 
 95179 Berkó
 
 
 
 
 
 
 1313 Berna
 
 
 
 
 
 
 629 Bernardina
 
 
 
 
 
 
 
 
 
 
 
 
 
 
 
 
 
 
 
 2034 Bernoulli
 
 
 
 422 Berolina
 
 
 
 
 
 
 
 
 154 Bertha
 
 420 Bertholda
 
 
 
 
 
 
 
 
 
 
 
 
 
 1729 Beryl
 
 
 
 
 
 46610 Bésixdouze
 
 1552 Bessel
 
 
 
 
 
 
 
 
 
 
 
 937 Bethgea
 
 
 
 
 
 
 
 
 
 
 
 250 Bettina
 
 
 
 
 
 
 
 1580 Betulia
 
 
 
 
 
 
 
 1611 Beyer
 
 
 
 
 
 
 
 
 
 
 
 
 
 
 
 
 
 
 
 
 218 Bianca
 
 
 
 
 1146 Biarmia
 
 38050 Bias
 
 
 
 
 
 
 
 
 4324 Bickel
 
 
 
 
 
 
 54598 Bienor
 
 
 
 
 
 
 
 
 
 
 
 
 
 
 
 
 585 Bilkis
 
 
 
 4175 Billbaum
 
 
 
 
 
 
 
 
 
 
 
 
 
 
 
 
 
 
 
 
 
 
 
 
 
 
 
 
 
 
 
 
 
 
 
 
 
 
 
 
 
 
 2029 Binomi
 
 2873 Binzel
 
 960 Birgit
 
 2744 Birgitta
 
 
 
 
 
 
 
 
 
 
 
 
 
 
 
 
 
 
 
 
 2038 Bistro
 5120 Bitias
 
 
 
 
 
 13241 Biyo
 
 
 
 
 2145 Blaauw
 
 
 
 
 
 
 
 
 
 
 
 
 
 
 
 
 
 
 
 
 
 
 
 
 
 
 
 
 
 
 
 
 
 3318 Blixen
 
 
 
 
 
 
 
 
 
 
 
 
 
 
 
 
 
 
 6708 Bobbievaile
 
 
 5642 Bobbywilliams
 
 
 
 
 
 
 
 2829 Bobhope
 
 63305 Bobkepple
 
 
 
 
 
 
 
 
 
 
 2637 Bobrovnikoff
 
 
 
 39890 Bobstephens
 
 6181 Bobweber
 
 
 
 
 
 
 
 
 
 
 
 
 
 
 
 998 Bodea
 
 
 
 
 
 
 
 
 
 
 
 
 
 
 
 
 
 
 
 
 
 
 
 3710 Bogoslovskij
 
 
 371 Bohemia
 
 720 Bohlinia
 1141 Bohmia
 
 
 
 1635 Bohrmann
 
 
 
 
 
 
 
 
 
 
 
 
 1983 Bok
 
 
 
 
 
 
 
 
 712 Boliviana
 
 
 
 
 
 
 
 
 1441 Bolyai
 
 
 
 
 
 
 
 
 
 
 
 
 
 767 Bondia
 
 
 
 
 
 
 
 
 
 
 
 
 
 361 Bononia
 
 1477 Bonsdorffia
 
 
 
 
 
 
 
 
 66652 Borasisi
 
 
 
 
 
 
 1916 Boreas
 
 
 
 
 
 
 
 
 
 
 
 
 
 
 
 
 
 
 
 
 3544 Borodino
 
 
 
 
 
 
 
 
 
 
 
 
 
 
 
 
 
 
 
 
 
 
 
 25108 Boström
 
 
 1354 Botha
 
 741 Botolphia
 
 
 
 
 
 
 
 11552 Boucolion
 
 
 
 
 
 
 
 7346 Boulanger
 
 
 
 
 
 
 
 
 
 1543 Bourgeois
 
 
 13390 Bouška
 859 Bouzaréah
 
 2246 Bowell
 
 
 
 
 
 
 
 
 1215 Boyer
 
 
 
 
 
 
 3628 Božněmcová
 
 10645 Brač
 
 
 
 
 
 
 
 3430 Bradfield
 
 
 
 
 
 
 
 
 
 
 
 
 
 
 
 
 
 
 
 1818 Brahms
 
 9969 Braille
 
 
 
 640 Brambilla
 
 
 
 
 1168 Brandia
 
 
 
 
 
 
 
 
 
 
 606 Brangäne
 
 
 
 
 
 
 293 Brasilia
 
 
 
 
 
 
 
 1411 Brauna
 
 
 
 
 
 
 
 
 
 
 
 786 Bredichina
 
 
 
 
 
 
 1609 Brenda
 
 
 
 
 761 Brendelia
 
 
 
 
 
 
 
 
 
 
 
 
 
 
 
 
 
 
 
 
 
 
 6117 Brevardastro
 
 
 
 
 
 
 
 
 
 
 
 
 
 
 
 
 
 
 
 
 
 
 
 
 
 
 
 
 
 
 
 
 
 
 
 
 4029 Bridges
 
 
 
 
 
 4209 Briggs
 
 
 
 450 Brigitta
 
 
 655 Briseïs
 1071 Brita
 
 
 
 
 1219 Britta
 
 
 
 
 
 
 521 Brixia
 
 
 
 
 
 
 
 
 
 
 
 
 
 
 
 
 
 1879 Broederstroom
 
 
 
 
 
 
 
 
 
 9949 Brontosaurus
 
 
 
 
 
 
 3309 Brorfelde
 
 
 24105 Broughton
 
 1746 Brouwer
 
 
 
 
 
 
 
 
 2430 Bruce Helin
 
 
 
 
 
 
 
 4957 Brucemurray
 
 
 455 Bruchsalia
 323 Brucia
 
 
 
 
 
 
 
 
 290 Bruna
 
 
 
 
 
 
 123 Brunhild
 
 
 
 
 
 
 
 
 
 1570 Brunonia
 
 
 
 901 Brunsia
 
 
 
 
 
 
 
 
 
 
 
 
 
 
 
 
 
 
 
 
 
 
 
 3141 Buchar
 
 
 
 
 
 
 
 908 Buda
 
 
 
 
 
 
 
 
 338 Budrosa
 
 
 
 
 
 7553 Buie
 
 
 
 
 
 
 
 2575 Bulgaria
 
 
 
 
 
 
 
 
 
 
 
 
 
 
 
 
 
 
 
 
 384 Burdigala
 
 
 
 
 
 374 Burgundia
 
 
 
 
 
 
 
 
 
 6235 Burney
 834 Burnhamia
 
 2708 Burns
 
 
 
 
 
 
 
 
 
 3254 Bus
 
 
 
 
 
 
 2490 Bussolini
 
 5196 Bustelli
 
 
 4936 Butakov
 
 
 
 
 
 
 
 
 
 
 
 
 
 
 199 Byblis
 
 2661 Bydžovský

See also 
 List of minor planet discoverers
 List of observatory codes

References 
 

Lists of minor planets by name